Jasmine Paolini (born 4 January 1996) is an Italian tennis player. She reached career-high WTA rankings of No. 44 in singles and 122 in doubles. Paolini has won one singles title (at the 2021 Slovenian Open) and one doubles title on the WTA Tour. She has also won one singles title on the WTA Challenger Tour along with eight singles titles and one doubles title on the ITF Circuit.

Personal life
Paolini was born to an Italian father and a mother of Ghanaian and Polish descent.

Professional career

2015: WTA Tour debut
Paolini was given a wildcard into the main draw of the doubles tournament at the Italian Open, partnering with Nastassja Burnett.

2018: First WTA wins
After failing to qualify for the Australian Open, Paolini joined the Italian team in the Fed Cup on two occasions.

On 1 May 2018, at the Prague Open, she won her first match as a lucky loser over a top-20 player when she beat Daria Kasatkina, and the following day, she defeated Anna Karolína Schmiedlová.

2021: First WTA singles & doubles titles, Olympics & top 100 debut, WTA 1000 third round
Entering the US Open unseeded, Paolini defeated Yaroslava Shvedova in the first round 6–3, 6–4, but then fell to 18th seed Victoria Azarenka.

She won her first titles in doubles and singles, respectively, at the Hamburg European Open in July, and at the Slovenia Open in Portoroz in September, defeating three seeded players en route. As a result, she moved in the rankings to world No. 64, on 20 September 2021.

In October, she reached for the first time the third round of a WTA 1000 tournament at the Indian Wells Open as a lucky loser where she defeated 14th seed Elise Mertens in the second round.

2022: Top 50 debut, second consecutive Indian Wells third round, first top-10 win
She repeated the feat at the Indian Wells Open reaching again round three, defeating second seed Aryna Sabalenka for the first top-10 win in her career. As a result, she entered the WTA 1000 tournament in Madrid and her home one in Rome directly into the main draw.

Performance timeline

Only main-draw results in WTA Tour, Grand Slam tournaments, Fed Cup/Billie Jean King Cup and Olympic Games are included in win–loss records.

Singles
Current after the 2023 Indian Wells Open.

Doubles
Current after the 2023 Australian Open.

WTA career finals

Singles: 2 (1 title, 1 runner-up)

Doubles: 2 (1 title, 1 runner-up)

WTA Challenger finals

Singles: 2 (1 title, 1 runner-up)

ITF Circuit finals

Singles: 16 (9 titles, 7 runner–ups)

Doubles: 4 (1 title, 3 runner–ups)

Top 10 wins

Notes

References

External links
 
 
 

1996 births
Living people
Italian female tennis players
Italian people of Ghanaian descent
Italian people of Polish descent
Italian sportspeople of African descent
Sportspeople from the Province of Lucca
Olympic tennis players of Italy
Tennis players at the 2020 Summer Olympics